The Joffrey Ballet is one of the premier dance companies and training institutions in the world today. Located in Chicago, Illinois, the Joffrey regularly performs classical and contemporary ballets during its annual performance season at the Civic Opera House, including its annual presentation of The Nutcracker. 

Founded in 1956 by dance pioneers Robert Joffrey and Gerald Arpino, the company has earned a reputation for boundary-breaking performances, including its 1987 presentation of Vaslav Nijinsky's The Rite of Spring, which reconstructed the original choreography from the 1913 premiere that was thought to be lost. Many choreographers have worked with the Joffrey, including Paul Taylor, Twyla Tharp, and George Balanchine.

History 

In 1956, a time during which most touring companies performed only reduced versions of ballet classics, Robert Joffrey and Gerald Arpino formed a six-dancer ensemble that toured the country in a station wagon pulling a U-Haul trailer, performing original ballets created by Joffrey. The original six dancers were Arpino, Dianne Consoer, Brunilda Ruiz, Glen Tetley, Beatrice Tompkins, and John Wilson. While Joffrey stayed in New York City to teach ballet classes and earn money to pay the dancers' salaries, Arpino led the troupe. The ensemble first performed in a major city in Chicago in 1957.  The Joffrey Ballet eventually settled down in New York City, under the name the Robert Joffrey Theatre Ballet.  In 1962 modern choreographer Alvin Ailey was invited to make a work for the company. Rebekah Harkness was an important early benefactor and she made international touring possible (Soviet Union, 1963), but in 1964 she and Joffrey parted ways.

Joffrey started again, building up a new company that made its debut in 1965 as the Joffrey Ballet. Following a successful season at the New York City Center in 1966, it was invited to become City Center's resident ballet company with Joffrey as artistic director and Arpino as chief choreographer.  Arpino's 1970 rock ballet Trinity was well received; Joffrey revived Kurt Jooss's The Green Table in 1967, followed by revivals of Ashton's Façade, Cranko's Pineapple Poll, Fokine's Petrushka (with Rudolf Nureyev in 1979), Nijinsky's Afternoon of a Faun, also with Nureyev, and Massine's Le Tricorne, Le Beau Danube and Parade. In 1973 Joffrey asked Twyla Tharp to create her first commissioned ballet, Deuce Coupe. The company continued as City Center Joffrey Ballet until 1977.  From 1977, it performed as the Joffrey Ballet, with a second home established in Los Angeles from 1982 to 1992.  In 1995, the company left New York City for Chicago to establish a permanent residence there. 
The first few years in Chicago were financially arduous for the company, nearly causing it to close several times, but audiences later became larger and younger. In 2005 the Joffrey Ballet celebrated its 10th anniversary in Chicago and in 2007 concluded a  two-season-long 50th-anniversary celebration, including a "River to River" tour of free, outdoor performances across Iowa, sponsored by Hancher Auditorium at the University of Iowa.

Popular culture 
The Joffrey Ballet was the first dance company to perform at the White House at Jacqueline Kennedy’s invitation, the first to appear on American television, the first classical dance company to use multi-media, the first to create a ballet set to rock music, the first to appear on the cover of TIME magazine, and the first company to have had a major motion picture based on it, Robert Altman’s The Company. In Robert Altman's penultimate film, The Company, Malcolm McDowell played the ballet company's artistic director, a character based on Gerald Arpino. The film is composed of stories gathered from the actual dancers, choreographers, and staff of the Joffrey Ballet. Most of the roles are played by actual company members.

The Joffrey Ballet appeared in the motion picture Save the Last Dance (2001), when the two protagonists of the story saw the company perform Sea Shadow and Les Présages in Chicago.

In Glee (2012), character Mike Chang is given a scholarship to attend the Joffrey Academy of Dance in Chicago.

Reconstructing The Rite of Spring 
In fall 1987 the Joffrey Ballet premiered a reconstructed version of Igor Stravinsky's seminal ballet The Rite of Spring in the city of Los Angeles. The original ballet debuted in 1913 in Paris, France, and was choreographed by Vaslav Nijinsky. Dance experts Millicent Hodson and Kenneth Archer spent 18 years gathering research on the original ballet in order to properly reconstruct it. Eighty percent of the original costumes were located and reconstructed for the performance, and Hodson and Archer were able to consult with  Nijinsky's rehearsal assistant Marie Rambert on the original choreography, before her death in 1982.

Activities

 the company, consisting of 40 dancers, performs its regular September–May season at the Auditorium Theatre in Chicago, and engages in several domestic and international tours throughout the year. Its repertoire consists of both classical and contemporary pieces, as well as annual December performances of The Nutcracker, presented in conjunction with the Chicago Philharmonic.  Since 2016, the company has presented the version of The Nutcracker, commissioned from choreographer Christopher Wheeldon, which is re-set at the time of the 1893 Chicago World's Fair.

In 2007 Gerald Arpino retired from day-to-day operations, becoming artistic director emeritus until his death in 2009. In October 2007 former Joffrey dancer Ashley Wheater, assistant artistic director and ballet master for San Francisco Ballet, became the third artistic director.  In 2019, the Joffery presented the world premiere of an entirely new "story ballet" based on Anna Karenina.  Choreographed by Yuri Possokhov, the Joffrey and The Australian Ballet also commissioned from composer Ilya Demutsky a new full-length orchestral score, the first in the Joffrey's history.

The Joffrey is located in Joffrey Tower, at 10 East Randolph Street in downtown Chicago. The company has an extensive touring schedule, an education program including the Joffrey Academy of Dance, Official School of The Joffrey Ballet, Community Engagement program, and collaborations with other visual and performing arts organizations.  In 2020, the Joffrey moved from the Auditorium theater and begin a performance partnership with the Lyric Opera of Chicago.

See also
 Billboards, a Joffrey Ballet production based on the songs of Prince.

References

Anawalt, Sasha. (January 19, 1998). The Joffrey Ballet: Robert Joffrey and the Making of an American Dance Company. Chicago: University Of Chicago Press; Paperback Edition.

External links

 The Gerald Arpino and Robert Joffrey Foundation
Archive footage of Robert Joffrey Ballet performing Pas des Déesses in 1965 at Jacob's Pillow
Joffrey Tower on Emporis
Company profile and upcoming performances on SeeChicagoDance.com
Archival Footage of the Joffrey Ballet performing "Son of Chamber Symphony" at the Jacob's Pillow Dance Festival in 2012
ITT's Salute to the Arts, Joffrey Ballet, 1991, created by WQXR, made available on the American Archive of Public Broadcasting, by the University of Georgia

 
Ballet companies in the United States
Ballet schools in the United States
Dance companies in Chicago
1956 establishments in Illinois
Performing groups established in 1956
Dance in Illinois